The 2020–21 Hawaii Rainbow Warriors basketball team represented the University of Hawaii at Manoa during the 2020–21 NCAA Division I men's basketball season. The Rainbow Warriors, led by sixth-year head coach Eran Ganot, played their home games at the Stan Sheriff Center in Honolulu, Hawaii. Hawaii was a member of the Big West Conference, and participated in their 9th season in that league.

Previous season  

The Rainbow Warriors finished the 2019–20 season 17–13, 8–8 in Big West play to finish fourth place. However, they were unable to play a single game in the Big West Conference tournament due to the COVID-19 pandemic.

Departures

Incoming transfers

2020 Commitments

Preseason

Media poll 
The preseason poll was released on November 12, 2020. Hawaii was picked to finish fourth in the Big West Conference standings.

Preseason Big West Men's Basketball All-Conference Team 
The Rainbow Warriors did not have anyone named to the preseason All-Conference Team.

Roster

Schedule and results  

|-
!colspan=9 style=| Non-conference regular season

|-
!colspan=9 style=| Big West regular season

|-
!colspan=12 style=| Big West tournament
|-

|-

Notes 

Source:

References 

2020
Hawaii
2020 in sports in Hawaii
2021 in sports in Hawaii